Just Good Old Rock and Roll is the fifth studio album by The Electric Prunes, released in 1969. It was recorded with a lineup put together by Wilson-Fisher management for David Hassinger, who owned the name, during a period in which the original group was disbanded. This album took the Prunes' music decidedly away from the previous experimentation and underground psychedelia into (as the title suggests) more driving rock music. While there are elements of mild psychedelia present, the group's new direction pointed towards the boogie-rock that would be further developed in the 1970s by bands such as The James Gang, Cactus and Foghat.

Background

Just Good Old Rock and Roll was the first Electric Prunes album almost entirely written and performed by the band members. While the record received some critical praise at the time, its sales were middling, and this would be the final Electric Prunes studio album until another lineup (with members from prior versions of the band) released Artifact decades later, in 2001.

The group toured throughout 1969 and 1970 and also released three singles. In early 1971, the Electric Prunes officially disbanded.

Guitarist Ron Morgan died in 1989, and keyboardist John Herron (who was briefly a band member during much of the album recording sessions before leaving) was killed in an automobile accident in the 1990s.
 
Former band members would, years later, reform the group, while none of the performers on this album would be included. None of the original band members were on this album.

In 2006, Collectors' Choice Music reissued Just Good Old Rock and Roll on CD.

Band name

The album cover described the band as the new improved Electric Prunes, an in-joke prompted by a contemporary album recorded by Blue Cheer and the preponderance of 'new and improved' products flooding the consumer market, as well as referring to the new lineup. This has led to confusion with some believing the band's name had been altered; however, the group was officially just The Electric Prunes.

Track listing

Side one
 "Sell" (M. Herron, John Herron) – 3:13
 "14 Year Old Funk" (Bill Daffern, Ron Morgan) – 3:31
 "Love Grows" (Bill Daffern, John Fleck, Ron Morgan, Brett Wade) – 4:07
 "So Many People to Tell" (Brett Wade) – 4:00
 "Finders Keepers, Losers Weepers" (Jimmy Holiday, Jimmy Lewis, Cliff Chambers) – 3:30

Side two
 "Giant Sunhorse" (Bill Daffern, Ron Morgan, Larry Tamblyn, Brett Wade) – 4:06
 "Violent Rose" (John Herron, Dick Whetstone) – 2:42
 "Thorjon" (Mark Kincaid, Brett Wade, Dick Whetstone) – 2:58
 "Silver Passion Mine" (Brett Wade) – 2:53
 "Tracks" (M. Herron, John Herron) – 2:44
 "Sing to Me" (Brett Wade) – 3:22

Personnel

Musicians
 Ron Morgan – guitar
 Mark Kincaid – guitar, backing vocals
 John Herron – organ
 Brett Wade – bass, backing vocals, flute
 Dick Whetstone – drums, lead vocals

Technical
 Dave Hassinger – producer
 Rick Heenan – engineer
 Juddy Phillips – engineer
 Ed Thrasher – art direction
 Tommy Mitchell – cover photo

External links
 Unofficial website
 Classicbands entry

References

The Electric Prunes albums
1969 albums
Acid rock albums
Reprise Records albums
Albums produced by David Hassinger
Collectors' Choice Music albums